Gorp is another name for trail mix, a snack food.

Gorp may also refer to:

 Gorp (film), a 1980 comedy film
 Gorp, Netherlands, a hamlet

See also
 Gorps (disambiguation)
 Van Gorp
 Game Grumps